Six ships and a naval station of the Royal Navy have been called HMS Tamar,   after the River Tamar in South West England:

  was a 16-gun sloop launched at Saltash in 1758 and stationed in Newfoundland from 1763. She was renamed HMS Pluto and became a fire-ship in 1777; the French captured her in 1780.
  was a store lighter launched in 1795 and purchased that year for Navy service.  She was broken up in 1798.
  was a 38-gun fifth rate launched in 1796 and broken up in 1810.
  was a 26-gun sixth rate launched in 1814, converted into a coal hulk in 1831 and sold in 1837.
  was an iron screw troop ship launched in 1863. She became a base ship in Hong Kong in 1897 and was scuttled in 1941.
  was the name for the Royal Navy's shore base in Hong Kong from 1897 to 1997, named after the initial vessel to serve as the base ship.
  is a Batch 2  constructed in Govan for delivery to the Royal Navy in 2020.

The   was briefly renamed Tamar on her transfer to the base in Hong Kong on 14 March 1946 as the nominal depot ship. The name reverted to Aire on 20 November 1946. She was wrecked in the early hours of 20 December 1946 when a typhoon drove her aground on Bombay Reef.

See also
 SS Tamar was a 3,207-ton British steamer run by the Royal Mail Steam Packet Company, that  sank off Brazil during World War I on 24 March 1915, while Tamar was on a passage from Santos to Le Havre. She was one of four ships that bore this name between 1854 and 1922.

References

Royal Navy ship names